Aster maackii is a plant species belonging to the family Asteraceae.

The species is described in 1861 by Eduard August von Regel. The species is named after Russian naturalist Richard Maack.

References

External links

maackii
Flora of Europe